Cheremkhovo is the name of several inhabited localities in Russia.

Modern localities

Urban localities 
Cheremkhovo, a town in Irkutsk Oblast;

Rural localities 
Cheremkhovo, Amur Oblast, a selo in Cheremkhovsky Rural Settlement of Ivanovsky District in Amur Oblast; 
Cheremkhovo, Kaliningrad Oblast, a settlement in Nizovsky Rural Okrug of Guryevsky District in Kaliningrad Oblast
Cheremkhovo, Sverdlovsk Oblast, a selo in Cheremkhovsky Selsoviet of Kamensky District in Sverdlovsk Oblast
Cheremkhovo, Tomsk Oblast, a village in Chainsky District of Tomsk Oblast
Cheremkhovo, Krasnochikoysky District, Zabaykalsky Krai, a selo in Krasnochikoysky District of Zabaykalsky Krai
Cheremkhovo, Ulyotovsky District, Zabaykalsky Krai, a selo in Ulyotovsky District of Zabaykalsky Krai

Alternative names
Cheremkhovo, alternative name of Cheremushka, a settlement in Gremyachinsky Selsoviet of Pribaykalsky District in the Republic of Buryatia;